Edmund Esbern Johannes Joensen (born 19 September 1944 in Oyri on Eysturoy) is a Faroese politician, who was the Prime Minister of the Faroe Islands from 1994 to 1998. From 2015 to 2022 served as a member of the Danish Folketing, being one of two Faroese seats in parliament. He did not stand in the 2022 Danish general election and his granddaughter Anna Falkenberg replaced him as Member of the Folketing for the Union Party of which Joensen is a member.

Political career
He was first elected to the Løgting in 1988, and remained in parliament until 2011. He was Prime Minister from 1994 to 1998, speaker of the parliament from 2002 to 2008, and member of the Danish Folketing from 1994 to 1998 and again from 2007 to 2015, and again from 2019. The Faroe Islands elect two members to the Danish Folketing. He returned to the Løgting from 2015 to 2019.

External links 

 Sambandsflokkurin 
 Biography on the website of the Danish Parliament (Folketinget)

References

1944 births
Living people
People from Eysturoy
Members of the Løgting
Prime Ministers of the Faroe Islands
Union Party (Faroe Islands) politicians
Speakers of the Løgting
Faroese members of the Folketing
Members of the Folketing 1994–1998
Members of the Folketing 2007–2011
Members of the Folketing 2011–2015
Members of the Folketing 2019–2022